Caroline Overington (born 1970) is an Australian journalist and author. Overington has written 13 books. She has twice won the Walkley Award for investigative journalism, as well as winning the Sir Keith Murdoch prize for journalism (2007), the Blake Dawson Waldron Prize (2008) and the Davitt Award for Crime Writing (2015).

Life and career 
Overington was born in Melbourne, Victoria in 1970.

She began her journalism cadetship with The Melton Mail Express, and other titles in The Age Suburban Newspaper group, covering courts, local council, and school fetes. Melbourne businessman and editor, Alan Kohler, recruited Overington to write for The Age in 1993, where she became a sports writer. Several of her pieces were selected for the Best Australian Sports Writing and Photography anthologies, published by Random House in the 1990s. She was awarded the Annita Keating Trophy for Female Journalism in Sport.

In 2002, Overington assumed a position as foreign correspondent in New York for The Sydney Morning Herald and The Age. Her first book, Only in New York, published by Allen & Unwin in 2006, is a comedy based on her family's experiences with young twins in the United States. While based in the US, Overington's work included an investigation into an Australian literary scandal involving Norma Khouri's book Forbidden Love. Together with Malcolm Knox, Overington won a Walkley Award for investigative journalism in 2004 for her research into the mysterious life of Jordanian-American-Australian author Norma Khouri. Both Overington and Knox appeared in Forbidden Lie$, the documentary by Anna Broinowski that won a Walkley Award and two Australian Film Institute (AFI) Awards.

Following her return to Australia in 2006, Overington gained a position as senior journalist with the News Limited newspaper The Australian. She uncovered the AWB scandal, in which AWB Limited (formerly the Australian Wheat Board), owned by the Australian Government, paid $290 million in kickbacks to the regime of Saddam Hussein, in contravention of the United Nations Oil-for-Food Humanitarian Program. Overington's book Kickback: Inside the Australian Wheat Board Scandal, released by Allen & Unwin in 2007, provided an account of the scandal.

During the 2007 federal election campaign, Overington made headlines for her conduct in the Wentworth electorate although no adverse findings against Overington were made. Overington was said to have been involved in an altercation with the Labor candidate George Newhouse, who claimed Overington had "whacked" him, while Overington said she had pushed him away with an open hand. The Australian published an apology to Newhouse from Overington over what as described as "an encounter" in December 2007.

Overington's first novel, Ghost Child was released in 2009 to both literary and popular acclaim. The book was short-listed for the Davitt Prize for Best Adult Crime Novel. Her second novel, I Came To Say Goodbye, was short-listed for Book of the Year and Fiction Book of the Year at the Australian Book Industry Awards in 2010. The novel Matilda is Missing, released in 2011, told the tale of a divorce custody case, through the eyes of a court-appointed psychologist.

In 2014, Overington's book Last Woman Hanged was released, documenting the results of her five-year investigation into the conviction and execution of Louisa Collins in New South Wales in 1889. In the book, Overington claims that Collins, who was tried four times for murder, suffered a miscarriage of justice and may well have been innocent. Overington linked the trial to Australian colonial history and to the early suffragette movement in Australia.

Her book, Missing William Tyrrell (2020), concerns the real-life case of William Tyrrell, who disappeared from Kendall on the Mid North Coast of New South Wales in 2014. Overington has said she wrote the book because "now is not the time to give up" looking for him. The book was inspired by a 9-part Australian crime podcast called Nowhere Child she hosted on the Tyrrell case, produced by The Australian, that aired from July to September 2019.

In 2021, she was appointed literary editor at The Australian newspaper.

Personal life 
Overington has homes in Bondi, Australia and Santa Monica, California. Her partner is writer Gideon Haigh.

Awards and prizes 
 2004 – Joint winner of the Walkley Award for Investigative Journalism for the Norma Khouri Investigation
 2006 – Awarded the second annual Sir Keith Murdoch Award for Journalism
 2007 – Winner of the Walkley Award for Investigative Journalism for coverage of the AWB Kickback Scandal
 2008 – Winner of the Blake Dawson Waldron Prize for Business Literature
 2015 – Winner of the Davitt (Non-Fiction) Award for Crime Writing

Works

Non-fiction

Fiction
 
 
 
 
 
 
 
 The Lucky One. HarperCollins. 2017. .
 
 One Chance. Audible Originals. 2021.
 The Cuckoo's Cry. HarperCollins. 2021. 
 Looking for Eden. Audible Originals. 2023.

References

External links
 

Living people
1970 births
Australian women journalists
Journalists from Melbourne
Walkley Award winners
Deakin University alumni
The Australian journalists
21st-century Australian novelists
21st-century Australian women writers
Australian non-fiction crime writers
The Sydney Morning Herald people